College House can refer to:

College House, Colombo, Sri Lanka is the administrative headquarters of the  University of Colombo
College House (University of Canterbury), Ilam, Christchurch, New Zealand is a hall of residence associated with the University of Canterbury.